The Armenian Swimming Federation, also known as the Water Kind of Sports & Swimming Association of Armenia, is the regulating body of swimming in Armenia, governed by the Armenian Olympic Committee. The headquarters of the federation is located in Yerevan.

History
The Federation was established in 1992 and is currently led by president Hovsep Mesropyan. The Federation is a full member of World Aquatics and the European Swimming League. The Federation records and manages the official list of Armenian records in swimming. Armenian swimming athletes have participated in various European, World and Olympic level championship competitions.

The Federation organizes the annual Prime Minister's Cup, a swimming competition held at Lake Sevan. In 2022, over 100 swimmers participated, including citizens from foreign countries.

See also
 Armenian Diving Federation
 Armenian Synchronized Swimming Federation
 List of World Aquatics member federations
 Sport in Armenia
 Water Polo Federation of Armenia

References

External links 
 Armenian Swimming Federation on Facebook

Sports governing bodies in Armenia
Armenia
Swimming in Armenia
Sports organizations established in 1992